Thiotricha thorybodes is a species of moth in the family Gelechiidae. It was described by Edward Meyrick in 1885. It is endemic to New Zealand.

Taxonomy
This species was first described by Edward Meyrick in 1885 and named Thistricha tyorybodes. in 1886 Meyrick gave a fuller description of this species under the name Thiotricha thorybodes.

Description
The wingspan is 11–13 mm. The forewings are rather dark fuscous, irregularly irrorated with ochreous-whitish, more strongly in the disc. The costa is suffusedly darker, with a darker triangular patch before the middle, its apex reaching to the fold. There is an obscure dark fuscous dot in the disc slightly beyond the middle and a small whitish-ochreous spot, sometimes nearly obsolete, in the disc at three-fourths. The hindwings are grey-whitish or whitish-grey.

References

Moths described in 1885
Thiotricha
Moths of New Zealand
Endemic fauna of New Zealand
Taxa named by Edward Meyrick
Endemic moths of New Zealand